South Western School District is a midsized, suburban public school district in York County, Pennsylvania. It serves the townships of Penn Township, Manheim Township and West Manheim Township. According to 2000 federal census data, South Western School District serves a resident population of 22,576 people. By 2010, the district's population increased to 26,768 people. In 2009, South Western School District residents’ per capita income was $20,618, while the median family income was $56,296. In the Commonwealth, the median family income was $49,501  and the United States median family income was $49,445, in 2010.

District schools
Baresville Elementary School
Manheim Elementary School
Park Hills Elementary School
West Manheim Elementary School
Emory H. Markle Middle School
South Western High School

Extracurriculars
South Western School District's students have access to a variety of clubs, activities and an extensive sports program.The District funds:

Boys
Baseball - AAAA
Basketball- AAAA
Cross Country - AAA
Football - AAAA
Golf - AAA
Lacrosse - AAAA
Soccer - AAA
Swimming and Diving - AAA
Tennis - AAA
Track and Field - AAA
Wrestling - AAA

Girls
Basketball - AAAA
Cheer - AAAA
Cross Country - AAA
Field Hockey - AAA
Lacrosse - AAAA
Soccer (Fall) - AAA
Softball - AAAA
Swimming and Diving - AAA
Girls' Tennis - AAA
Track and Field - AA
Volleyball - AAA

Markle Intermediate Sports

Boys
Basketball
Cross Country
Football
Track and Field
Wrestling	

Girls
Basketball
Cross Country
Field Hockey
Track and Field
Volleyball 

According to PIAA directory July 2012

References

School districts in York County, Pennsylvania